"Oh La La La" is a song by German Eurodance group 2 Eivissa. It is produced by "Team 33" and was released on 6 June 1997, as their debut and lead single from the album of the same name. The song is their most commercially successful single to date, topping the chart in Spain and peaking at number two in Italy. It also reached number 13 in the United Kingdom and number 19 in Ireland. On the Eurochart Hot 100, "Oh La La La" peaked at number 32 in October 1997. The song interpolates the hook and guitar riff from Crystal Waters' 1991 song "Gypsy Woman".

Critical reception
Larry Flick from Billboard wrote that "this is good-time dance fodder with no lofty agenda. Instead, Euro-pop producers Team 33 has crafted a galloping bassline that make you want to twirl and sing along with the song's giddy chorus. Fun, fun, fun stuff". Pan-European magazine Music & Media noted that "their fine production job makes the most of a strong hook and nagging chorus, reminiscent of Crystal Waters' Gypsy Woman"." Alan Jones from Music Week described the song as "a high octane pop/house smash of maddening simplicity." He concluded, "Get used to it, for it's going to be a hit."

Music video
The accompanying music video for "Oh La La La" was directed by Camelot.

Track listings
 CD maxi - Europe (1997)
 "Oh La La La" (Radio Mix) - 3:35
 "Oh La La La" (Cool Summer Mix) - 3:38
 "Oh La La La" (Extended Version) - 4:58
 "Oh La La La" (Salinas Mix) - 5:11
 "Oh La La La" (Eivissa '97 Club Mix) - 6:19
 "Oh La La La" (S/M In Motion Remix) - 6:32

Charts

References

1997 debut singles
1997 songs
Eurodance songs
Number-one singles in Spain